
Gmina Przewóz is a rural gmina (administrative district) in Żary County, Lubusz Voivodeship, in western Poland, on the German border.

The gmina contains part of the protected area called Muskau Bend Landscape Park.

Villages
Gmina Przewóz contains the villages and settlements of Bucze, Dąbrowa Łużycka, Dobrochów, Dobrzyń, Jamno, Lipna, Mała Lipna, Mielno, Piotrów, Potok, Przewóz, Sanice, Sobolice, Straszów and Włochów.

Neighbouring gminas
Gmina Przewóz is bordered by the town of Łęknica and by the gminas of Lipinki Łużyckie, Pieńsk, Trzebiel, Węgliniec, Wymiarki and Żary. It also borders Germany.

References

Przewoz
Żary County